General Day may refer to:

Allan Day (fl. 1980s–2020s), U.S. Air Force major general
Hannibal Day (1804–1891), U.S. Army brigadier general
James L. Day (1925–1998), U.S. Marine Corps major general
Karl S. Day (1896–1973), U.S. Marine Corps lieutenant general